is a Japanese voice actress who is affiliated with Accent.

Voice roles

Television animation
Bleach (Aaroniero Arruruerie - high-pitched head)
The Law of Ueki (Tarō Myōjin)
Ojamajo Doremi series (Hasebe, Leon)
Fighting Beauty Wulong (Yunbo Naniwa)
Gad Guard (Linda)
Galaxy Angel (Forte Stollen)
Zatch Bell! (Bamū)
Shijou Saikyou no Deshi Kenichi (Taichi Koga)
Digital Monster X-Evolution (MetalGarurumon X)
Digimon Adventure series (Gabumon) (voice-acting debut)
Digimon Tamers (Henry Wong)
Duel Masters (Fōsu)
Naruto (Orochimaru (young))
Fullmetal Alchemist (Envy, others)
Trinity Blood (Paula)
Black Cat (Shiki)
Pokémon Advanced Generation (Clefairy, villager)
PoPoLoCrois (Bomu)
Paranoia Agent (Taira Yūichi)
Lovely Idol (Maki Yōko)
Rockman EXE (Dingo)
Samurai Champloo (Kawara Sousuke)
Tamagotchi! (Kikitchi)

Theatrical animation
Fullmetal Alchemist the Movie: Conqueror of Shamballa (2005) (Envy)
Digimon Adventure tri. (2015) (Gabumon)
Digimon Adventure: Last Evolution Kizuna (2020) (Gabumon)

Video games
Fullmetal Alchemist 2: Curse of the Crimson Elixir (Envy)
Fullmetal Alchemist: Dream Carnival (Envy)
Galaxy Angel series (Forte Stollen)
Galaxy Angel II series (Forte Stollen)
Digimon games: (Gabumon)
Super Smash Bros. series: (Pokémon Trainer (Male))
Live A Hero (Crowne Applefield)

Dubbing roles
Justice League (Morgaine le Fey)
24 (Jenny Dodge)
Totally Spies! (Alex & Carmen)
The Tudors (Princess Mary Tudor)

References

External links
 

1975 births
Living people
Japanese voice actresses